Zhartsy is a rural locality (a village) in Oktyabrskoye Rural Settlement, Vyaznikovsky District, Vladimir Oblast, Russia. The population was 19 as of 2010.

Geography 
Zhartsy is located 21 km southwest of Vyazniki (the district's administrative centre) by road. Agafonovo is the nearest rural locality.

References 

Rural localities in Vyaznikovsky District